The Kumul Khanate was a semi-autonomous feudal Turkic khanate (equivalent to a banner in Mongolia) within the Qing dynasty and then the Republic of China until it was abolished by Xinjiang governor Jin Shuren in 1930. The khanate was located in present-day Hami prefecture of Xinjiang.

History

The khans of Kumul were direct descendants of the khans of the Chagatai Khanate, and thus the last descendant of the Mongol Empire.

The Ming dynasty established a tributary relationship with the Turpan Khanate, that put end to Kara Del in 1513 after its conquest by Mansur Khan in the Ming–Turpan conflict. The khanate paid tribute to the Ming. The Turpan Khanate under Sultan Said Baba Khan supported Chinese Muslim Ming loyalists during the 1646 Milayin rebellion against the Qing dynasty.

Beginning in 1647, after the defeat of the Ming loyalists, during which the Kumul Prince Turumtay was killed at the hands of Qing forces, Kumul submitted to the Qing and sent tribute. It came under Qing rule and remained a khanate as a part of the Qing Empire. The title "Jasak Tarkhan" was granted to Abdullah Beg Tarkhan (son of Kumul ruler Muhammad Shah-i-Beg Tarkhan), ruler of Hami in 1696 after submitting to the Qing as a vassal during the Dzungar–Qing War.

The khanate had fought against the Dzungars for the Qing. Kumul continued as a vassal khanate when Xinjiang was changed into a province in 1884 after the Dungan revolt.

The khans also were given the title of Qinwang (Prince of the First Rank ) by the Qing Empire. The khans were allowed enormous power by the Qing court, with the exception of administering execution, which had to be allowed by a Chinese official posted in Kumul. The khans were officially vassals to the emperor of China, and every six years were required to visit Beijing to be a servant to the emperor during a period of 40 days.

It was also known as the principality of Kumul, and the Chinese called it Hami. The khans were friendly to Chinese rule and authorities.

The khan Muhammad and his son and successor Khan Maqsud Shah heavily taxed his subjects and extorted forced labor, which resulted in two rebellions against his rule in 1907 and 1912.

The khan was assisted by a chancellor/vizer/chief minister in his court. The last khan, Maqsud Shah, had Yulbars Khan, the tiger Prince of Hami, as his chancellor.

The khan paid a small annual tribute to Urumchi and in return Xinjiang government paid him a formal subsidy of 1,200 silver taels each year—no doubt in Yang Zengxin's opinion a small enough sum for ensuring the continued obedience of the strategically vital khanate.

The Han Chinese governor of Xinjiang, Yang Zengxin, was a monarchist and tolerated the khanate. He was friendly toward the khan Maqsud Shah.

Around the 1920s Japanese secret agents began exploring the Kumul area.

It was the fact that the khanate existed which prevented the Uyghurs from rebelling, since the khanate represented a government where a man of their ethnicity and religion was reigning. The abolition of the khanate led to a bloody rebellion.

By 1928, shortly after the assassination of Yang Zengxin, it was estimated that the aging Maqsud Shah ruled over a population of between 25,000 and 30,000 Kumulliks. The khan was responsible for levying taxes and dispensing justice; his administration rested on twenty one Begs, four of whom were responsible for Kumul itself, five others being responsible for the plains villages and the remaining twelve administering the mountainous regions of the Barkul and Karlik Tagh. Maqsud Shah also maintained a Uyghur militia which was reputed to be better trained than its counterpart in the predominantly Chinese Old City. The soil of the oasis was rich and well-cultivated, and the conditions of the Kumulliks before 1929 was one of relative contentment and prosperity. According to British missionaries Mildred Cable and Francesca French, both of whom knew Maqsud Shah personally, the continued existence of the Khanate of Kumul was also of psychological importance to the Uyghurs of Turfan and the Tarim Basin, who were tolerant to Chinese rule so long as their own seat of the government was firmly established at Hami under Khan Maqsud Shah who still hold the proud title of King of the Gobi.

Upon Maqsud Shah's death on 6 June 1930 Jin Shuren replaced the khanate with three normal provincial administrative districts Hami, Yihe, and Yiwu. This set off the Kumul Rebellion, in which Yulbars Khan attempted to restore the heir Nasir to the throne.

List of khans 
The list of the Kumul Khanate khans is as follows:

See also
Turkic peoples
List of Turkic dynasties and countries
Qing dynasty in Inner Asia

References

Turkic dynasties
History of Xinjiang
Qing dynasty
Former kingdoms
Uyghurs
Former countries in Chinese history
Khanates
1696 establishments in Asia